Chan Hung-lit (7 June 1943 – 24 November 2009),  was a Hong Kong actor famous for portraying villains from the 1960s to 1980s.

Background
Chan started his acting career after joining Shaw Brothers Studio in 1964.  and mainly acted in wuxia and martial arts films. He rose to fame after portraying the antagonist in the 1966 wuxia film, Come Drink with Me. Chan later got his first leading role as a protagonist in the 1970 wuxia film, The Winged Tiger. In 1988, Chan took a hiatus from his acting career and was involved in the garment industry. He later resumed his acting career by joining TVB in 1995, left the following year and did not return again until 2003. In 2004, Chan won the TVB Anniversary Award for Best Supporting Actor for his performance in the historical drama series, War and Beauty. He was the elder brother of  Steve Chen Hao.

Death
At 4:20 p.m. on 24 November 2009, while waiting to tape an episode of Off Pedder on TVB City, Chan Hung-lit complained of sudden chest pains and fell into a coma in the changing room. He was transported by ambulance to the emergency ward of Tseung Kwan O Hospital, where he died at 7:11 p.m. at the age of 66.

Filmography

Films

Television series

See also
 Shaw Brothers Studio
 Cinema of Hong Kong

References

External links
 Chen Hung-lieh at allmovie.com
Chen Hung-Lieh at hkmdb.com
Hong Kong Cinemagic

 Chen Hung-lieh at senscritique.com

 
|-
! colspan="3" style="background: #DAA520;" | TVB Anniversary Awards
|-

1943 births
2009 deaths
Hong Kong male television actors
Hong Kong male film actors
Hong Kong film directors
Male actors from Shanghai
TVB veteran actors
Chinese male film actors
Chinese male television actors
20th-century Chinese male actors
21st-century Chinese male actors
20th-century Hong Kong male actors
21st-century Hong Kong male actors